Ethmia tripunctella is a moth in the family Depressariidae. It is found in North Macedonia, Bulgaria, Asia Minor, Iraq, Iran and Russia.

The larvae have been recorded feeding on Onosma stellulata.

Subspecies
Ethmia tripunctella tripunctella (Staudinger, 1879) (North Macedonia, Bulgaria, Asia Minor)
Ethmia tripunctella rayatella (Amsel, 1959) (Asia Minor: Taurus Mountains, Iraq: Kurdistan, south-western Iran)

References

Moths described in 1879
tripunctella
Moths of Europe
Insects of Turkey